The 2016 All-Pro teams were named by the Associated Press (AP), Pro Football Writers of America (PFWA), and Sporting News (SN) for performance in the 2016 NFL season. While none of the All-Pro teams have the official imprimatur of the NFL (whose official recognition is nomination to the 2017 Pro Bowl), they are included in the NFL Record and Fact Book and also part of the language of the 2011  NFLPA Collective Bargaining Agreement. Any player selected to the first-team of any of the teams can be described as an "All-Pro." The AP team, with first-team and second-team selections, was chosen by a national panel of fifty NFL writers and broadcasters. For the first time, the nationwide panel of 60 sports writers and broadcasters who regularly cover the NFL voted for specific positions on the offensive line, a "flex" player on offense, a fifth defensive back, and a punt returner and special teamer. The Sporting News All-NFL team is voted on by NFL players and executives and will be released at a later date. The PFWA team is selected by its more than 300 national members who are accredited media members covering the NFL.

Teams

Key
 AP = Associated Press first-team All-Pro
 AP-2 = Associated Press second-team All-Pro
 AP-2t = Tied for second-team All-Pro in the AP vote
 PFWA = Pro Football Writers Association All-NFL
 SN = Sporting News All-Pro

Position differences
PFWA and SN did not separate the tackles and guards into more specific positions as the AP did.

Notes

References

All-Pro Teams
2016 National Football League season